Sir Austin Danger Powers  is a fictional character from the Austin Powers series of films, and is created and portrayed by Mike Myers. He is the protagonist of Austin Powers: International Man of Mystery (1997), The Spy Who Shagged Me (1999) and Austin Powers in Goldmember (2002).

He is a womanizing, hard partying British spy embodying the Swinging London psyche and hippie culture of the 1960s who, with his nemesis Dr. Evil, was frozen in a cryonics experiment. The series' humor follows his attempts to adjust to the modern world as he continues to try to save it from terrorism.

Personality

Austin Powers was a character seen as a parody of James Bond, and being influenced by Evelyn Tremble (played by Peter Sellers) in the spoof James Bond 1967 movie Casino Royale. Other notable influences were Harry Palmer (played by Michael Caine who would go on to play Austin's father, Nigel, in Goldmember), especially his thick horn-rimmed glasses, and the flamboyant dress sense of Jason King (played by Peter Wyngarde).

The character of Austin Powers represents an archetype of 1960s Swinging London, with his advocacy for free love, his use of obscure expressions and his clothing style (including crushed velvet suits and Beatle boots).

Development
Myers, Matthew Sweet and Susanna Hoffs formed the faux British 1960s band Ming Tea after Myers' Saturday Night Live stint in the early 1990s. The band members all performed under pseudonyms with 1960s personas. Myers adopted the pseudonym and character of Austin Powers.

This group made a number of live club and television performances in character. Myers' then wife, Robin Ruzan, encouraged him to write a film based on Austin Powers. Obituaries of Simon Dee (1935–2009), the radio and BBC television presenter, stated that his "Sixties grooviness" made him the inspiration for the character.

Heavily influenced by British pop culture growing up, Mike Myers has claimed his British-born father was the inspiration behind Austin Powers.

Other media
 HBO purchased the rights to produce a cartoon series based on the Austin Powers films in May 1999. Despite announcing plans for a thirteen-episode season, HBO ultimately shelved the project.
 Austin Powers has been used for advertising numerous products and endorsements, such as Pepsi Cola.
 He also appears in the music videos for Madonna's "Beautiful Stranger", Beyoncé's "Work It Out" and Britney Spears' "Boys".
 The video games he appears in are Austin Powers Pinball, Austin Powers: Welcome to My Underground Lair!, Austin Powers: Oh, Behave!, and Austin Powers Operation: Trivia.
 Powers is feature in an episode of the web show Epic Rap Battles of History. He is performed by the series co-creactor Nice Peter.

Discography

Studio albums
 International Man of Mystery (1997)
 The Spy Who Shagged Me (1999)
 Goldmember (2002)

In popular culture
In November 2010, he was voted #23 in Entertainment Weeklys list "The 100 Greatest Characters of The Last 20 Years."

See also
Outline of James Bond
Our Man Flint, another James Bond parody film; Austin calls its sequel, In Like Flint, his favorite movie
Matt Helm as played in 1960s films by Dean Martin shares many qualities with Austin Powers, including his cover profession as a fashion photographer.

References

Austin Powers characters
Fictional cryonically preserved characters
Fictional British secret agents
Fictional people from London
Fictional knights
Fictional twins
Fictional judoka
Fictional writers
Fictional characters who break the fourth wall
Fictional gunfighters
Fictional photographers
Film characters introduced in 1997
Male characters in film
Time travelers